Negros is a parish in Redondela, Pontevedra Province, Spain.

Towns in Spain